Goldasht-e Sofla (also Romanized as Goldasht-e Soflá; also known as Bondashlū Sarchasmeh, Bondashlū Sarcheshmeh, Gondashlū Sarchesmeh, Gondeshlū-ye Pā’īn, and Gondeshlū-ye Soflá) is a village in Majdabad Rural District, in the Central District of Marvdasht County, Fars Province, Iran. At the 2006 census, its population was 195, in 43 families.

References 

Populated places in Marvdasht County